Clavus laetus is a species of sea snail, a marine gastropod mollusk in the family Drilliidae.

This species is also mentioned as Clavus laetus.

Description
The size of an adult shell varies between 8 mm and 20 mm.

The smooth shell is polished. The whorls show a strongly tuberculated shoulder. The body whorl shows a second inferior row of small, sometimes obsolete tubercles. The shell is white, banded with brown, the band often more or less interrupted.

Distribution
This species occurs in the demersal zone of the tropical Indo-Pacific off New Guinea, New Caledonia, the Strait of Macassar, Indonesia, the Solomons and the Philippines; also off Australia (Northern Territory, Queensland, Western Australia).

References

 Adams, H. & Adams, A. 1858. The genera of Recent Mollusca arranged according to their organization. London : John Van Voorst Vol. 3 pls 1-138.
 Weinkauff, H.C. 1876. Das Genus Pleurotoma. pp. 49–136 in Küster, H.C., Martini, F.W. & Chemnitz, J.H. (eds). Systematisches Conchylien-Cabinet von Martini und Chemnitz. Nürnberg : Bauer & Raspe Vol. 4.
 Maes, V.O. 1967. The littoral marine mollusks of Cocos-Keeling Islands (Indian Ocean). Proceedings of the Academy of Natural Sciences, Philadelphia 119: 93-217
 Cernohorsky, W.O. 1978. Tropical Pacific Marine Shells. Sydney : Pacific Publications 352 pp., 68 pls.
 Kay, E.A. 1979. Hawaiian Marine Shells. Reef and shore fauna of Hawaii. Section 4 : Mollusca. Honolulu, Hawaii : Bishop Museum Press Bernice P. Bishop Museum Special Publication Vol. 64(4) 653 pp. 
 Wells F.E. (1991) A revision of the Recent Australian species of the turrid genera Clavus, Plagiostropha, and Tylotiella (Mollusca: Gastropoda). Journal of the Malacological Society of Australia 12: 1–33.
 Wilson, B. 1994. Australian Marine Shells. Prosobranch Gastropods. Kallaroo, WA : Odyssey Publishing Vol. 2 370 pp. 
 Higo, S., Callomon, P. & Goto, Y. (1999). Catalogue and bibliography of the marine shell-bearing Mollusca of Japan. Osaka. : Elle Scientific Publications. 749 pp
 Tucker, J.K. 2004 Catalog of recent and fossil turrids (Mollusca: Gastropoda). Zootaxa 682:1-1295

External links
 

laetus
Gastropods described in 1843